Indestructible Tour was a 2008/09 concert tour by American heavy metal band Disturbed in support of the group's fourth studio album, Indestructible, which was released in June 2008.

The tour saw extensive legs throughout the United States, as well as tours in Europe, Canada, Australia, New Zealand, and Japan. A DVD release entitled Indestructible in Germany, which features a portion of the band's performance at the 2008 edition of the Rock am Ring Festival, was released in December 2008 exclusively through electronics retailer Best Buy.

In March 2009, the band began a fourth iteration of their self-created package tour, Music as a Weapon, for U.S. markets. The trek featured acts such as Killswitch Engage, Chimaira, and Lacuna Coil, among others. The final leg took place in Europe in June 2009, beginning in Interlaken, Switzerland and wrapping up in early July in Turku, Finland.

Tour dates

 1^  Rescheduled from July 10, 2009.
 2^ Headline show; non-Music as a Weapon date.
 3^  Rescheduled from March 20, 2009.
 4^  Rescheduled from May 10, 2009.

Canceled dates

 a^ Dates canceled due to "routing problems".
 b^ Festival canceled due to poor ticket sales and the organisers' inability to secure additional appearances by headliner-level acts.
 c^ Date canceled due to "unforeseen circumstances".

Support acts

 All That Remains (May 25–June 3, 2009)
 Alter Bridge (August 29–September 12, 2008)
 Art of Dying (April 27–May 15, 2008; November 23–December 16, 2008; May 25–June 3, 2009)
 Behind Crimson Eyes (August 29–September 6, 2008)
 Chimaira (March 21–May 17, 2009)
 Egypt Central (November 23–December 16, 2008)
 Five Finger Death Punch (April 27–May 15, 2008)
 Killswitch Engage (March 21–May 17, 2009)
 Lacuna Coil (March 21–May 17, 2009)
 P.O.D. (September 2–12, 2008)

 Redline (September 9–12, 2008)
 Sevendust (January 17–February 28, 2009)
 Shinedown (October 4–November 2, 2008; May 23, 2009)
 Skindred (January 16–February 28, 2009; May 25–June 3, 2009)
 Spineshank (March 21–May 17, 2009)
 Staind (April 10, 2009)
 Static-X (April 10, 2009)
 Suicide Silence (March 29–May 17, 2009)

Personnel
 David Draiman – lead vocals
 Dan Donegan – guitars
 John Moyer – bass guitar, backing vocals
 Mike Wengren – drums

References

2008 concert tours
2009 concert tours